This is a discography of Pelléas et Mélisande, an opera by Claude Debussy. The premiere performance was at the Opéra-Comique in Paris on 30 April 1902. The list includes all of the studio recordings and also some live performances available on audio CD and DVD.

Opera discographies
Operas by Claude Debussy